Barnet is a masculine given name which may refer to:

 Barnet Burns (1805–1860), English sailor, trader and showman
 Barnet Isaacs (1851-1897), birth name of Barney Barnato, British mining entrepreneur in South Africa
 Barnet Kellman (born 1947), American television and film director, television producer and film actor
 Barnet Kenyon (1850-1930), British colliery worker, trade union official and politician
 Barnet M. Levy (1917-2014), American oral pathologist and professor

See also
 Barnett, a given name and surname 

Masculine given names